Tayinloan is a village situated on the west coast of the Kintyre peninsula in Argyll and Bute, Scotland.  The village has a sub post office, general store and a small hotel (all currently closed), a village hall and a play park. There is a cafe bar situated beside the ferry car park which also offers self-catering or bed and breakfast accommodation. The nearest towns are Campbeltown ( south) and Tarbert ( north).

A ferry service runs between the village and Ardminish on the Isle of Gigha.

Killean House near Tayinloan was built in the 1880s by John James Burnet for James Macalister Hall, after the original house burnt down.

Largie Castle is a former mansion house at Tayinloan. The house was designed by the architect Charles Wilson for the Hon. Augustus Moreton Macdonald and was built in 1857–9. The house was demolished in 1958.

References
3. The book Paranormal Hero by James A. Hirons is dedicated to 'the people of Tayinloan', the author having just moved there before the books publication. His following book The Druids Of Pneuma is largely inspired by the beaches, then finally The Tavern On Gallows Hill for the American series Savage Realms were also written here. 

Villages in Kintyre